The 2019 Florida Gators baseball team represented the University of Florida in the sport of baseball during the 2019 college baseball season.  Florida competed in the Eastern Division of the Southeastern Conference (SEC).  Home games were played at Alfred A. McKethan Stadium on the university's Gainesville, Florida campus.  The team was coached by Kevin O'Sullivan in his twelfth season as Florida's head coach.  The Gators entered the season as the defending conference champions, reaching the national semifinals in the 2018 College World Series before being eliminated by Arkansas.

Preseason

Preseason All-American teams

1st Team
Tyler Dyson – Starting Pitcher (Baseball America) 

2nd Team
Wil Dalton – Outfielder (NCBWA)

3rd Team
Wil Dalton – Outfielder (Perfect Game)
Wil Dalton – Outfielder  (Collegiate Baseball)
Wil Dalton – Outfielder (Baseball America)

SEC media poll
The SEC media poll was released on February 7, 2019 with the Gators predicted to finish in second place in the Eastern Division.

Preseason All-SEC teams

2nd Team
 Tyler Dyson – Starting Pitcher

Roster

By player

By position

Coaching staff

Schedule

! style="background:#FF4A00;color:white;"| Regular Season
|- valign="top" 

|- bgcolor="#ddffdd"
| February 15 ||  || No. 6 || McKethan Stadium Gainesville, FL || 8–2 || Butler (1–0) || Seminaris (0–1) || None || 4,851 || 1–0 || –
|- bgcolor="#ddffdd"
| February 16 || Long Beach State || No. 6 || McKethan Stadium || 5–2 || Mace (1–0) || Baayoun (0–1) || Crisp (1) || 4,344 || 2–0 || –
|- bgcolor="#ddffdd"
| February 17 || Long Beach State || No. 6 || McKethan Stadium || 3–1 || Leftwich (1–0) || Ruiz (0–1) || Crisp (2) || 3,981 || 3–0 || –
|- bgcolor="#ffdddd"
| February 19 || at  || No. 5 || USF Baseball StadiumTampa, FL || 1–6 || Stuart (1–0) ||  || None || 2,363 || 3–1 || –
|- bgcolor="#ffdddd"
|  ||  || No. 5 || McKethan Stadium || 1–7 || Michaelis (1–1) || Scott (0–1) || None || 3,281 || 3–2 || –
|- bgcolor="#ffdddd"
| February 22 || Miami (FL)Rivalry || No. 5 || McKethan Stadium || 2–5 ||  || Butler (1–1) ||  || 4,775 || 3–3 || –
|- bgcolor="#ddffdd"
| February 23 || Miami (FL)Rivalry || No. 5 || McKethan Stadium || 9–3 || Mace (2–0) || Gates (0–1) || Crisp (3) || 6,206 || 4–3 || –
|- bgcolor="#ddffdd"
| February 24 || Miami (FL)Rivalry || No. 5 || McKethan Stadium || 4–1 || Leftwich (2–0) || Van Belle (1–1) || Crisp (4) || 4,398 || 5–3 || –
|- bgcolor="#ddffdd"
| February 26 || at  || No. 7 || Jacksonville, FL || 5–410 || Scott (1–1) || Mauloni (0–1) || Crisp (5) || 1,122 || 6–3 || –
|- bgcolor="#ffdddd"
| February 27 || UCF || No. 7 || McKethan Stadium || 9–12 || Westberg (1–0) || McMullen (0–2) || Hakanson (1) || 3,167 || 6–4 || –
|-

|- bgcolor="#ddffdd"
| March 1 ||  || No. 7 ||  || 16–4 || Dyson (1–0) || Harris (0–1) || None || 3,335 || 7–4 || –
|- bgcolor="#bbbbbb"
| March 2 || Winthrop || No. 7 || McKethan Stadium || colspan=7| Postponed (rain) Makeup: March 3 as a doubleheader
|- bgcolor="#ddffdd"
| March 3 (1) || Winthrop || No. 7 || McKethan Stadium ||  || Mace (3–0) || Peek (1–1) || None || 3,357 || 8–4 || –
|- bgcolor="#ddffdd"
| March 3 (2) || Winthrop || No. 7 || McKethan Stadium || 5–37 ||  ||  || Crisp (6) || 3,192 || 9–4 || –
|- bgcolor="#ddffdd"
| March 5 ||  || No. 5 || McKethan Stadium || 15–0 || Scott (2–1) || Bitner (1–1) || None || 2,929 || 10–4 || –
|- bgcolor="#ffdddd"
| March 6 || Florida Gulf Coast || No. 5 || McKethan Stadium || 2–7 || Lumbert (2–1) || Luethje (0–1) || None || 2,955 || 10–5 || –
|- bgcolor="#ddffdd"
| March 8 ||  || No. 5 || McKethan Stadium || 6–5 || Mace (4–0) || Politz (2–1) || Crisp (7) || 3,249 || 11–5 || –
|- bgcolor="#ddffdd"
| March 9 || Yale || No. 5 || McKethan Stadium || 15–1 || Leftwich (4–0) || Nambiar (0–2) || None || 3,756 || 12–5 || –
|- bgcolor="#ddffdd"
| March 10 || Yale || No. 5 || McKethan Stadium || 4–3 || Dyson (2–0) || Stiegler (1–2) || Ruth (1) || 3,248 || 13–5 || –
|- bgcolor="#ddffdd"
| March 12 || No. 10 Florida StateRivalry || No. 5 || McKethan Stadium || 20–7 || Alintoff (1–0) || Haney (2–1)  || None || 5,385 || 14–5 || – 
|- bgcolor="#ffdddd"
| March 15 || No. 6 Mississippi State || No. 5 || McKethan Stadium || 5–6 || Small (2–0) || Mace (4–1) || None || 4,215 || 14–6 || 0–1
|- bgcolor="#ffdddd"
| March 16 (1) || No. 6 Mississippi State || No. 5 || McKethan Stadium || 5–10 || Ginn (5–0) || Leftwich (4–1) || Liebelt (2) || 4,019 || 14–7 || 0–2
|- bgcolor="#ddffdd"
|  || No. 6 Mississippi State || No. 5 || McKethan Stadium || 4–2 || Dyson (2–0) || James (2–1) || Scott (1) || 3,247 || 15–7 || 1–2
|- bgcolor="#ddffdd"
| March 19 || Jacksonville || No. 14 || McKethan Stadium || 13–8 || Crisp (1–0) || Murphy (1–1) ||  || 3,223 || 16–7 || –
|- bgcolor="#ffdddd"
| March 21 || at No. 8 Vanderbilt || No. 14 || Hawkins FieldNashville, TN || 0–5 || Fellows (5–0) || Mace (4–2) || None || 3,191 || 16–8 || 1–3
|- bgcolor="#ffdddd"
| March 22 || at No. 8 Vanderbilt || No. 14 || Hawkins Field || 2–15 || Raby (4–0) || Leftwich (4–2) || None || 3,626 || 16–9 || 1–4
|- bgcolor="#ffdddd"
| March 23 || at No. 8 Vanderbilt || No. 14 || Hawkins Field || 4–14 || Rocker (2–2) || Dyson (3–1) || Brown (5) || 3,626 || 16–10 || 1–5
|- bgcolor="#ddffdd"
| March 26 || Rivalry ||  || Baseball GroundsJacksonville, FL || 4–2 || Scott (2–1) || Velez (2–2) || None || 8,041 || 17–10 || –
|- bgcolor="#ddffdd"
| March 29 || Alabama || No. 23 || McKethan Stadium || 3–1 || Mace (5–2) || Finnerty (4–3) || None || 4,521 || 18–10 || 2–5
|- bgcolor="#ddffdd"
| March 30 || Alabama || No. 23 || McKethan Stadium || 12–3 || Scott (3–1) || Love (3–1) || None || 5,156 || 19–10 || 3–5
|- bgcolor="#ddffdd"
| March 31 || Alabama || No. 23 || McKethan Stadium || 6–3 || Ruth (1–0) || Ras (1–2) || None || 3,785 || 20–10 || 4–5
|-
| colspan=11 | Rescheduled from March 17 due to the threat of rain.
|- 

|- bgcolor="#ddffdd"
| April 2 ||  ||  || McKethan Stadium || 12–1 || Crisp (2–0) || Wilson (1–3) || None || 3,036 || 21–10 || –
|- bgcolor="#ffdddd"
| April 5 ||  || No. 21 || Swayze FieldOxford, MS || 4–12 || Myers (2–0) || Mace (5–3) || None || 11,026 || 21–11 || 4–6
|- bgcolor="#ffdddd"
| April 6 (1) || at No. 18 Ole Miss || No. 21 || Swayze Field || 4–16 || Nikhazy (3–2) || Dyson (3–2) || None || 10,220 || 21–12 || 4–7
|- bgcolor="#ffdddd"
|  || at No. 18 Ole Miss || No. 21 || Swayze Field || 10–12 || Caracci (1–1) || Crisp (2–1) || None || 10,220 || 21–13 || 4–8
|- bgcolor="#ddffdd"
| April 9 || at Florida StateRivalry ||  || Tallahassee, FL || 3–1 || Specht (1–0) || Haney (2–2) || None || 5,368 || 22–13 || –
|- bgcolor="#ddffdd"
| April 11 || South Carolina ||  || McKethan Stadium || 9–5 || Mace (6–3) || Morgan (3–2) || None || 3,414 || 23–13 || 5–8
|- bgcolor="#ffdddd"
| April 12 || South Carolina ||  || McKethan Stadium || 3–6 || Tringali (2–0) || Scott (3–2) || None || 4,531 || 23–14 || 5–9
|- bgcolor="#ddffdd"
| April 13 || South Carolina ||  || McKethan Stadium || 6–4 || Luethje (1–1) || Sweatt (2–3) || None || 4,908 || 24–14 || 6–9
|- bgcolor="#ddffdd"
| April 16 || Jacksonville ||  || McKethan Stadium || 8–4 || Crisp (3–1) || Temple (2–1) || Pogue (1) || 3,337 || 25–14 || –
|- bgcolor="#ddffdd"
| April 18 || at No. 14 LSU ||  || Alex Box StadiumBaton Rouge, LA || 16–9 || Mace (7–3) || Hilliard (0–2) || None || 10,132 || 26–14 || 7–9
|- bgcolor="#ffdddd"
| April 19 || at No. 14 LSU ||  || Alex Box Stadium || 1–13 || Henry (4–2) || Scott (3–3) ||  || 10,766 || 26–15 || 7–10
|- bgcolor="#ffdddd"
| April 20 || at No. 14 LSU ||  || Alex Box Stadium || 2–11 || Walker (3–3) || Leftwich (4–3) || None || 11,327 || 26–16 || 7–11
|- bgcolor="#ffdddd"
| April 23 ||  ||  || McKethan Stadium || 11–13 || Schneider (3–1) ||  || None || 2,886 || 26–17 || –
|- bgcolor="#ddffdd"
| April 26 || Kentucky ||  || McKethan Stadium || 10–8 || Scott (4–3) || Ramsey (2–4) || Crisp (8) || 3,664 || 27–17 || 8–11
|- bgcolor="#ffdddd"
| April 27 || Kentucky ||  || McKethan Stadium || 1–5 ||  || Leftwich (4–4) || None || 4,068 || 27–18 || 8–12
|- bgcolor="#ddffdd"
| April 28 || Kentucky ||  || McKethan Stadium || 12–8 || Scott (5–3) || Coleman (2–4) || None || 3,401 || 28–18 || 9–12
|-
| colspan=11| Rescheduled from April 7 due to the threat of rain.
|- 

|- bgcolor="#ffdddd"
| May 3 || at No. 9 Georgia ||  || Foley FieldAthens, GA || 4–6 || Locey (8–1) || Mace (7–4) || Kristofak (6) || 3,106 || 28–19 || 9–13
|- bgcolor="#bbbbbb"
| May 4 || at No. 9 Georgia ||  || Foley Field || colspan=7| Postponed (rain) Makeup: May 5 as a 7-inning doubleheader
|- bgcolor="#ffdddd"
| May 5 (1) || at No. 9 Georgia ||  || Foley Field || 1–97 || Elliott (6–3) || Leftwich (4–5) || None || 2,845 || 28–20 || 9–14
|- bgcolor="#ffdddd"
| May 5 (2) || at No. 9 Georgia ||  || Foley Field || 1–47 || Wilcox (2–0) || Crisp (3–2) || None || 2,845 || 28–21 || 9–15
|- bgcolor="#ddffdd"
| May 7 || South Florida ||  || McKethan Stadium || 7–3 || Pogue (1–0) || Yager (2–2) || Specht (1) || 3,082 || 29–21 || –
|- bgcolor="#ddffdd"
| May 10 || Tennessee ||  || McKethan Stadium || 10–9 || Crisp (4–2) || Walsh (0–2) || None || 3,542 || 30–21 || 10–15
|- bgcolor="#ffdddd"
| May 11 || Tennessee ||  || McKethan Stadium || 7–8 || Crochet (4–3) || Specht (1–1) || Sewell (1) || 3,659 || 30–22 || 10–16
|- bgcolor="#ffdddd"
| May 12 || Tennessee ||  || McKethan Stadium || 4–5 || Jackson (1–0) || Crisp (4–3) || Hunley (1) || 3,265 || 30–23 || 10–17
|- bgcolor="#ddffdd"
| May 16 || at No. 24 Missouri ||  || Taylor StadiumColumbia, MO || 5–4 || Mace (8–4) || Ash (2–2) || Butler (1) || 2,310 || 31–23 || 11–17
|- bgcolor="#ddffdd"
| May 17 || at No. 24 Missouri ||  || Taylor Stadium || 2–0 || Leftwich (5–5) || Sikkema (7–4) || None || 3,182 || 32–23 || 12–17
|- bgcolor="#ddffdd"
| May 18 || at No. 24 Missouri ||  || Taylor Stadium || 4–3 || Scott (6–3) || Dulle (4–4) || None || 1,675 || 33–23 || 13–17
|-

|-
! style="background:#FF4A00;color:white;"| Postseason
|-

|-
|- bgcolor="#ffdddd"
|  ||  || (11) ||  Hoover, AL || 7–810 ||  || Crisp (4–4) || None || 4,135 || 33–24 || 0–1
|-

|-
|- bgcolor="#ffdddd"
| May 31 ||  || (3) ||  Lubbock, TX|| 8–11 || Johnson (5–2) || Mace (8–5) || None || 4,530 || 33–25 || 0–1
|- bgcolor="#ddffdd"
|  || vs. (4)  || (3) || Dan Law Field at Rip Griffin Park || 13–5 || Leftwich (6–5) || Giovinco (8–6) || None || 4,567 || 34–25 || 1–1
|- bgcolor="#ffdddd"
|  || vs. No. 24 (2) Dallas Baptist || (3) || Dan Law Field at Rip Griffin Park || 8–9 || Fouse (6–0) || Pogue (1–1) || Carraway (5) || 4,679 || 34–26 || 1–2
|-

Rankings from D1Baseball. All times Eastern. Parentheses indicate tournament seedings. Retrieved from FloridaGators.com

Lubbock Regional

Record vs. conference opponents

Rankings

2019 MLB draft

References

Florida Gators
Florida Gators baseball seasons
Florida Gators baseball
Florida